Government Degree College, Verinag also known as Degree College GDC Verinag is a University of Kashmir affiliated non-autonomous degree college located in Verinag in the Anantnag district of Jammu and Kashmir, India.

It is affiliated with the University of Kashmir and is recognised by the University Grants Commission of India, under sections 2(f) and 12(b) of UGC, Act 1956.

Location 

Establishment 
Government of Jammu and Kashmir established the college in March 2018 under the Prime Ministers Reconstruction Plan.

Courses offered
The college offers bachelor's degrees in arts and science. It also provides specialization in computer subjects and the arts.

Bachelor courses

Bachelor's in Arts
Bachelor's in Arts (with computer applications)

See also
 List of colleges in Anantnag
 Govt. Degree College Verinag

References 

Degree colleges in Kashmir Division
Universities and colleges in Jammu and Kashmir
University of Kashmir
2005 establishments in Jammu and Kashmir
Educational institutions established in 2005
Colleges affiliated to University of Kashmir